Colonel John Caulfeild (1661–1707), styled The Honourable from birth, was an Irish soldier and politician.

He was the fourth son of the 1st Viscount Charlemont and his wife Hon. Sarah Moore, second daughter of Charles Moore, 2nd Viscount Moore of Drogheda. Caulfield was educated at Trinity College, Dublin and was appointed Burgess of Charlemont in 1697. From 1703 to 1707, he was Member of Parliament (MP) for Charlemont.

Caulfeild was married to Sydney Somerville, daughter of James Somerville. They had a son and a daughter.

References

1661 births
1707 deaths
Alumni of Trinity College Dublin
John
Irish MPs 1703–1713
Members of the Parliament of Ireland (pre-1801) for County Armagh constituencies
Younger sons of viscounts